is a Japanese football player for Nara Club.

Club statistics
Updated to 20 February 2017.

References

External links

1994 births
Living people
Association football people from Yamagata Prefecture
Japanese footballers
J2 League players
J3 League players
Japan Football League players
Montedio Yamagata players
J.League U-22 Selection players
Arterivo Wakayama players
Nara Club players
Association football defenders